John Wilbur James, Jr. (born January 21, 1949) is an American former college and professional football player who was a punter in the National Football League (NFL) for thirteen seasons during the 1970s and 1980s.  James played college football for the University of Florida, and thereafter, he played professionally for the Atlanta Falcons, the Detroit Lions and the Houston Oilers of the NFL.

Early life 

James was born in Panama City, Florida in 1949.   James has three older sisters.

College career 

James attended the University of Florida in Gainesville, where he was a walk-on punter for the Florida Gators football team under coaches Ray Graves and Doug Dickey from 1969 to 1971.  He was the Gators' starting punter in 1970 and 1971, and kicked fifty-seven punts for an average distance of 40.3 yards during his senior year in 1971.  James graduated from Florida with a bachelor's degree in 1971, and was inducted into the University of Florida Athletic Hall of Fame as a "Gator Great" in 1978.

Professional career 

He reached the peak of his profession, being selected three times for the Pro Bowl, an NFL all-star game pitting the best players from the American Football Conference (AFC) against the best of the National Football Conference (NFC). James finished his thirteen-season NFL career with a total of 1,083 punts for 43,992 yards and an average distance of 40.6 yards.

Life after the NFL 

James is the father of four children, Helen James, Scott James, Matthew James, Susanna James, and Rose James and grandfather of six.  He has held the position of executive director of Gator Boosters, Inc. at the University of Florida since 1986, and oversees the booster fund-raising operation to fund athletic scholarships for Gator athletes.

See also 

 Florida Gators football, 1960–1969
 Florida Gators football, 1970–1979
 History of the Atlanta Falcons
 List of Detroit Lions players
 List of University of Florida alumni
 List of University of Florida Athletic Hall of Fame members

References

Bibliography 

 Carlson, Norm, University of Florida Football Vault: The History of the Florida Gators, Whitman Publishing, LLC, Atlanta, Georgia (2007).  .
 Golenbock, Peter, Go Gators!  An Oral History of Florida's Pursuit of Gridiron Glory, Legends Publishing, LLC, St. Petersburg, Florida (2002).  .
 Hairston, Jack, Tales from the Gator Swamp: A Collection of the Greatest Gator Stories Ever Told, Sports Publishing, LLC, Champaign, Illinois (2002).  .
 McCarthy, Kevin M.,  Fightin' Gators: A History of University of Florida Football, Arcadia Publishing, Mount Pleasant, South Carolina (2000).  .
 McEwen, Tom, The Gators: A Story of Florida Football, The Strode Publishers, Huntsville, Alabama (1974).  .
 Nash, Noel, ed., The Gainesville Sun Presents The Greatest Moments in Florida Gators Football, Sports Publishing, Inc., Champaign, Illinois (1998).  .

1949 births
Living people
American football punters
Atlanta Falcons players
Detroit Lions players
Florida Gators football players
Houston Oilers players
National Conference Pro Bowl players
People from Panama City, Florida
Players of American football from Gainesville, Florida